Alec Pearce James (22 May 1889 – 14 August 1961) was a Welsh cricketer.  James's batting style is unknown, but it is known he bowled right-arm fast-medium.  He was born in Neath, Glamorgan.

James made his debut for Carmarthenshire in the 1910 Minor Counties Championship against Monmouthshire.  James played 5 further Minor Counties Championship for Carmarthenshire in 1910, the last coming against Cornwall.

Moving to Australia, where he taught at St Peter's College, Adelaide, James made his first-class debut for South Australia in December 1914, against New South Wales.  He made 3 further first-class appearances for South Australia, the last coming against Victoria in February 1915.  In his 4 appearances, he scored 93 runs at a batting average of 13.28, with a high score of 23.  With the ball, he took 13 wickets at a bowling average of 35.92, with best figures of 3/56.

He died in Torquay, England on 14 August 1961.

References

External links
Alec James at ESPNcricinfo
Alec James at CricketArchive

1889 births
1961 deaths
Cricketers from Neath
Welsh cricketers
Carmarthenshire cricketers
South Australia cricketers